Nicole Brune (born 1981) is a former model and current American painter of fantasy and pin-up art.
Nicole Brune was born in Fullerton, California in 1981.  She graduated from California State University, Fullerton with a Bachelor of Fine Arts.

Nicole's illustrations of Josie Stevens have been seen on E! Entertainment's "Married to Rock" and is also on one of Steve Stevens custom Suhr guitars.

Nicole is mentioned in this article about San Diego Comic Con 2010

Article about Steve Stevens custom Suhr guitar with Nicole's "Madness" painting of Josie Stevens

Cover Artist for 2015 Lady Death #0:  Death Becomes Her Limited Edition -   

Koncept Magazine Artist

Von Gutenberg Magazine Artist

Playboy TV

G4 TV

Cover Artist for Pinup Industry Magazine - Spring 2017 https://issuu.com/pinupindustry/docs/spring_2017_-_digital_version

Black Gate Top 10 Hottest Pinup Artist - #1 

The Art of Nicole Brune:  A Collection of A Collection of Works by Pin-Up Artist and Illustrator, Nicole Brune - November 25, 2014

Guest Appearances:

2018

Albuquerque Comic Con (Featured Guest) - Albuquerque Convention Center - Albuquerque, NM - January 12-14, 2018

Oregon Coast Comic Con (Featured Guest) - Tillamook County Fairgrounds - Tillamook, OR - March 24-25, 2018

Cherry City Comic Con (Featured Guest, Panelist) - Oregon State Fairgrounds - Salem, OR - April 21-22, 2018

Monterey Comic Con (Featured Guest, Panelist) - Monterey Convention Center - Monterey, CA - June 29, 30, July 1st, 2018

2017 Schedule

Northwest Comic Con (Featured Guest) - Tillamook County Fairgrounds - Tillamook, OR March 18-19, 2017

Cherry City Comic Con (Featured Guest, Panelist) - Oregon State Fairgrounds - Salem, OR - April 8-9, 2017

LionCon (Featured Guest, Panelist) - Rivers Edge Convention Center - St. Cloud, MN - September 2-3, 2017

Monterey Comic Con (Featured Guest, Panelist) - Monterey Convention Center - Monterey, CA - November 10-11, 2017

2016 Schedule

Albuquerque Comic Con (Featured Guest) - Albuquerque Convention Center - Albuquerque, NM - January 8-10, 2016

Scream & Ink (Featured Guest) - Oregon State Fairgrounds - Salem, OR - February 27-28, 2016

Your Mini Con (Featured Guest) - Westin - Henderson, NV - March 5-6, 2016

Silicon Valley Comic Con (Featured Guest, Panelist) - San Jose Convention Center - San Jose, CA - March 18-20, 2016

Cherry City Comic Con (Featured Guest, Panelist) - Oregon State Fairgrounds - Salem, OR - April 30-May 1, 2016

Space City Comic Con (Featured Guest) - NRG Center - Houston, TX - May 27-29, 2016

2015 Schedule

Albuquerque Comic Con (Featured Guest) - Albuquerque Convention Center - Albuquerque, NM - January 9-11, 2015

Cherry City Comic Con (Featured Guest, Panelist) - Oregon State Fairgrounds - Salem, OR - April 11-12, 2015

Big Wow Comic Fest (Featured Guest) - San Jose Convention Center - San Jose, CA - April 18-19, 2015

Northwest Comic Fest (Featured Guest) - Salem Convention Center - Salem, OR - August 15-16, 2015

Central Coast Comic Con (Featured Guest, Panelist) - Ventura Fairgrounds - Ventura, CA - August 28-30, 2015

Emerald Valley Comic Fest (Featured Guest) - Lane County Events Center - Eugene, OR - October 3-4, 2015

Wizard World Philadelphia (Featured Guest) - Pennsylvania Convention Center - Philadelphia, PA - May 7-10, 2015

2014 Schedule

Albuquerque Comic Con (Featured Guest) - Hotel Albuquerque Old Town - Albuquerque, NM - January 10-12, 2014

Cherry City Comic Con (Featured Guest) - Oregon State Fairgrounds - Salem, OR - May 10-11, 2014

Big Wow Comic Fest (Featured Guest) - San Jose Convention Center - San Jose, CA - May 17-18, 2014

Capital City Comic Con (Featured Guest) - Palmer Events Center - Austin, TX - July 11-13, 2014

Central Coast Comic Con (Featured Guest) - Ventura Fairgrounds - Ventura, CA - September 12-14, 2014

Tree City Comic Con (Featured Guest) - Expo Idaho - Boise, ID - October 17-18, 2014

Pac-Con (Featured Guest) - Spokane, WA - October 24-26, 2014

2013 Appearances

Gallery of Progressive Arts (Featured Exhibit) - Riverside, CA - June 6, 2013

2010 Appearances

Nicole was invited to the Airbrush Action Magazine Getaway - October 2010

References

External links 
 http://nicolebruneillustrations.com
 Nicole Brune's blog
 Nicole Brune's deviant art page

1981 births
Living people
21st-century American painters
American women painters
21st-century American women artists